Mary Hunter Wolf (December 4, 1904 – November 3, 2000), born Mary Hunter, was an American theater director and producer.

She made her Broadway directorial debut on 4 April 1944 at the Bijou Theater with Only the Heart, the first play written by Horton Foote.

She was director of the initial 1954 Broadway production of Jerome Robbins' version of Peter Pan, now the standard version on the American stage, and was founding executive director of the American Shakespeare Theatre in Stratford, Connecticut.

References

Variety Staff, Mary Hunter Wolf (obituary), Variety, Nov 10, 2000.

External links 
 Mary Hunter Wolf Papers. Yale Collection of American Literature, Beinecke Rare Book and Manuscript Library.

American theatre directors
Women theatre directors
1904 births
2000 deaths